The Silver Stream (sometimes written Silverstream) is a small river flowing close to the town of Mosgiel in Otago, New Zealand.

The Silver Stream, known in Māori as Whakaehu, rises in the Silverpeaks hills north of Dunedin, on the southern slope of Silver Peak itself, and flows initially southwards through a steep-sided forested valley which widens to become Whare Flat, before turning west at the eastern edge of the Taieri Plains at the foot of Three Mile Hill, close to Invermay Research Station. It continues in a southwesterly direction past the northern edge of Mosgiel, reaching the Taieri River two kilometres north of Allanton.

Silver Stream is the site of a historic water race. The race began at a weir high on the river and traversed the sides of Swampy Summit and Flagstaff before emptying into a reservoir in Kaikorai Valley. Despite efforts to improve the race with the installation of a pump in 1920, it was not successful; problems with subsidence led to much of the race being enclosed in pipe, and the race was finally abandoned in the 1960s.

The river's flow is generally small (at below one cumec), but it has a history of flooding. This has been largely remedied by the artificial raising of its banks, especially close to Mosgiel. In mid-2006, after heavy rain, the Silver Stream flooded at some points, but did not flood on the part of the bank running close to the town.

Several walking routes are located close to or in the valley of the Silver Stream, most of which are aimed at more experienced trampers.

Silverstream School and Silverstream Drive in Mosgiel are named for the river.

References

Rivers of Otago
Mosgiel
Rivers of New Zealand
Taieri River